is a Japanese model and beauty pageant titleholder who won Miss Universe Japan 2011 and then represented Japan at Miss Universe 2011.

Born in Tokyo, she was a sales clerk before running in the pageant.

Miss Universe Japan 2011
Kamiyama was crowned Miss Universe Japan 2011 by outgoing national titleholder Maiko Itai on June 17, 2011, at the Tokyo Dome City Hall at Tokyo, Japan.

Miss Universe 2011
As the official representative of her country, she competed in the 2011 Miss Universe pageant, which was broadcast live from São Paulo, Brazil on September 12, 2011, Kamiyama competed to succeed Miss Universe titleholder, Ximena Navarrete of Mexico. Even though Kamiyama was not placed amongst the top 16, she was named the 9th runner-up for the Best National Costume.

References

External links
Miss Universe Japan

Japanese female models
Miss Universe 2011 contestants
Living people
1987 births
Japanese beauty pageant winners
People from Tokyo
Models from Tokyo Metropolis